Mialy Razakandisa Rajoelina (born Mialy Razakandisa) is the First Lady of Madagascar. She is the spouse of Andry Rajoelina, the president of the High Transitional Authority of Madagascar from 2009 until 2014 and president of Madagascar since 2019.

Early life, education, marriage
Mialy was born as the oldest of three girls and has a master's degree in finance and accounting management at the Conservatoire National des Arts et Métiers in Paris. In 1994, Mialy met her future husband Andry Rajoelina in a high school in Antananarivo. The couple maintained a long-distance relationship for six years while Mialy completed her studies in Paris and Andry started his career as an entrepreneur. They reunited in Madagascar in 2000 and got married in the same year. Mialy has three kids with Andry: two boys, Arena (born 2002) and Ilontsoa (born 2005), and a daughter born in 2007 that the couple named Andrialy, a contraction of their own names.

Business and links with France
Mialy's marriage   with Andry allowed the later  become head of Doma Pub, a company owned by Mialy's family  in which Andry was to become leader on the local advertising hoarding market and kick start his career as an entrepreneur. Most of her family went to France during the 2009 crisis due to safety concerns, including the couple's children. Mialy has French citizenship which she obtained while studying in France.

As first lady
Mialy has made frequent public appearances, such as when she spoke at a TED Talks in Antananarivo in 2011. Since her husband has become president Mialy has founded the FITIA association, which aims to collect donations and offer them the most vulnerable in Madagascar, especially women. Supporters of Mialy and her husband say that the FITIA show that the couple care for Madagascar and its people while opponents say that the organization is a propaganda campaign aimed at increasing their popularity. Mialy has admitted to using her popularity to help her husband although she also adds that she sees nothing wrong with it and that people who support her usually support her husband as well. 
She is the president and spokesperson of Fitia, a humanitarian association aiming at helping the poor and the sick. She was the youngest first lady Madagascar has ever had.

Faith
Like her husband, Mialy is a Roman Catholic, in April 2013 she and Andry met with Pope Francis to become the first African leader and first lady to be received by the new pope at that time.

References

Living people
First ladies of Madagascar
Malagasy expatriates in France
People with acquired French citizenship
Malagasy Roman Catholics
Year of birth missing (living people)